Jackson Owusu is a Ghanaian professional footballer who currently plays for Gor Mahia in the Kenya Premier League.

Playing career
Owusu has played for several Ghanaian teams and is currently playing with Gor Mahia as a midfielder.

International career
In November 2013, coach Maxwell Konadu invited him to be a part of the Ghana squad for the 2013 WAFU Nations Cup. He helped the team to a first-place finish after Ghana beat Senegal by three goals to one.

References

Living people
Ghanaian footballers
WAFU Nations Cup players
Association football midfielders
1993 births
2014 African Nations Championship players
Ghana A' international footballers